Emiliano Agustín Villar Vidal (born 21 October 1999) is a Uruguayan professional footballer who plays as a forward for Cerro Largo, on loan from Nacional.

Career
Villar joined hometown club Atlético El General at the age of four, where he spent majority of his youth career. After homesickness stopped him from completing his trials at Peñarol and Defensor Sporting, he joined Boston River in 2017. He made his professional debut for the club on 10 February 2018 in a 3–1 defeat against Montevideo Wanderers. In January 2020, he joined Cerro on a season long loan deal.

In October 2020, Villar joined Nacional on a permanent deal until the end of 2023 season. On 30 November, he scored the lone goal in Nacional's 1–0 win against Boston River. In April 2021, he joined Rentistas on a season long loan deal.

Career statistics

Honours
Nacional
Uruguayan Primera División: 2020

References

External links
 

1999 births
Living people
People from Colonia del Sacramento
Association football forwards
Uruguayan footballers
Uruguayan Primera División players
Boston River players
C.A. Cerro players
Club Nacional de Football players
C.A. Rentistas players